John or Johnny King may refer to:

Academics
John Edward King (1858–1939), author and headmaster
John E. King (1913–2008), American educator and academic administrator
John Leslie King (born 1951), professor at the University of Michigan School of Information
John Mark King, leader of St. James-Bond Church (1863–1883) and principal of Manitoba College in Winnipeg

Entertainment
 John Crookshanks King (1806–1882), Scottish sculptor in Boston, Massachusetts
 John King (painter) (1929–2014), English painter
 John 'Dusty' King (1909–1987), American actor
 John Michael King (1926–2008), American actor
 John Reed King (1914–1979), American radio and TV game show host
 John King (ukulelist) (1953–2009), American ukulele player
 John King (author) (born 1960), English author of novels such as The Football Factory
 John King (comics), a fictional character in the Marvel Comics Universe
 John King (country singer) (born 1988), country musician
 John King (record producer), American music producer, one of the Dust Brothers
 John King, lead guitarist for American rock band The Litter.

Military
John King, 1st Baron Kingston (died 1676), Anglo-Irish soldier during the Wars of the Three Kingdoms
John King (explorer) (1838–1872), Irish soldier and member of the Burke and Wills expedition in Australia
John King (Medal of Honor) (1865–1938), U.S. Navy chief petty officer and twice recipient of the Medal of Honor
John F. King, U.S. Army officer and Georgia's Insurance and Safety Fire Commissioner
John H. King (1820–1888), U.S. Army officer and American Civil War general

Politics

U.S.
 John King (New York congressman) (1775–1836), United States Representative from New York
 John A. King (1788–1867), Governor of New York, 1857–1858
 John Pendleton King (1799–1888), United States Senator from Georgia
 John A. King (1817–1900), New York politician
 J. Floyd King (1842–1915), U.S. Representative from Louisiana
 John Rhodes King, member of the sixth (1855) and eleventh (1866) Texas Legislatures
 John M. King, member of the 6th South Dakota State Senate in 1899
 Jack P. King (1909–1982), member of the Hawaii House of Representatives
 John W. King (1918–1996), Governor of New Hampshire, 1963–1969
 John McCandish King (1927–2016), member of the Illinois House of Representatives
 John G. King (politician) (born 1942), in Massachusetts
 John King Jr. (born 1975), United States Secretary of Education, 2016–2017
 John Richard C. King (born 1976), South Carolina state legislature
 John King (Los Angeles politician), president of the Common Council
 John King (Michigan politician), member of the Michigan House of Representatives
 John Edward King (Louisiana judge), Justice of the Louisiana Supreme Court for one day

U.K.
 John King, 2nd Baron King (1706–1740), English MP and peer
 John King (official) (1759–1830), of Aldenham House, Herts., English Under-Secretary of State for Home Affairs and MP
 John Gilbert King (1822–1901), Irish Conservative politician
 John Francis King (1926–1998), mayor of Galway, 1978–1979
 John King (MP for Gloucester), English MP for Gloucester
 Sir John King, 2nd Baronet (died 1740), Anglo-Irish politician

Elsewhere
 John Charles King (1817–1870), member of Victorian Legislative Assembly for Evelyn
 John King (Australian politician) (1820–1895), Victorian Legislative Council and Gippsland
 John Warwick King (1856–1927), Canadian Member of Parliament from Ontario

Religion
John King (bishop of London) (died 1621), Church of England bishop
John King (Covenanter) (died 1679), Church of Scotland minister, Scots Worthy, executed and mutilated in Edinburgh
John King (Rector of Chelsea) (1652–1732), English clergyman
John King (Master of Charterhouse) (1655–1737), English clergyman and headmaster
John Glen King (1732–1787), English cleric and antiquarian
John King (bishop of Portsmouth) (1880–1965), English Roman Catholic bishop
John King (priest) (died 1638), Canon of Windsor, and of Westminster
John King (Archdeacon of Killala) (died 1818), Anglican priest in Ireland

Sports

Cricket
John King (Suffolk cricketer) (1797–1842), English cricketer
John King (cricketer, born 1871) (1871–1946), English cricketer
John William King (1908–1953), English cricketer and nephew of cricketer John King
Bart King (1873–1965), American cricketer, John Barton King

Football and rugby
Johnny King (footballer, born 1926) (1926–2010), English footballer for Leicester in the 1949 FA Cup Final
Johnny King (footballer, born 1932), English footballer  for Stoke and Crewe in the 1950s and 1960s
John King (footballer, born 1933) (1933–1982), Welsh international footballer for Swansea
John King (footballer, born 1938) (1938–2016), English footballer for  Tranmere and Port Vale
John King (rugby league), rugby league footballer of the 1940s
John King (Scottish footballer) (1888–1984), Scottish footballer
John Abbott King (1883–1916), English rugby player
Johnny King (born 1942), Australian rugby league footballer of the 1960s and '70s
John M. King, Mississippi College head football coach before George Bohler in 1925

Other sports
John King (baseball) (born 1994), American baseball player
Johnny King (boxer) (1912–1963), English boxer 1920s–1940s
John King (long jumper) (born 1963), English long jumper
John Paul King (born 1982), Irish hurler
John King (racing driver) (born 1988), American stock car racing driver

Other
John King (murderer) (1974–2019), American white supremacist and one of the three perpetrators of the Murder of James Byrd Jr.
John King (pirate) (died 1717), juvenile pirate in the crew of "Black Sam" Bellamy
John King (police officer) (1830–1881), police constable at the Eureka Stockade rebellion
John G. King (physicist) (1925–2014), experimental physicist at MIT
John King (journalist) (born 1963), American journalist for CNN
 John King, USA, American television show
John King, Baron King of Wartnaby (1917–2005), English businessman, chairman of British Airways
John Herbert King, British clerk and spy for the Soviet Union
USS John King (DDG-3), U.S. Navy Destroyer named for the Medal of Honor recipient
John A. King House, historic house in Lake Butler, Florida

See also
 Jack King (disambiguation)
 John Dashwood-King (disambiguation)
 Jon King (born 1954), musician
 Jonathan King (disambiguation)
 King (surname)
 John, King of England